The Aurora Fossil Museum is a natural science museum in Aurora, North Carolina.  The museum's collection is built around fossils recovered from the nearby phosphate mine owned since 1995 by PotashCorp, but also includes fossil specimens donated from around the world as well as geology and meteorite displays.   Fossils from the local mine are  approximately 18-22 and 2.5-5 million years old coming from layers in the mine traced to the early Miocene and Pliocene eras in the Pungo River and Yorktown formations. The museum also maintains 2 spoils piles in the park across the street from the museum.  The pits are filled with mine tailings where small shell, coral, shark tooth and other fossils are relatively easy to find.  The pits are open during daylight hours daily. 

The museum provides information about the geological history of the Aurora area, which is known as a center for fossil hunting (especially due to the phosphate mine).  The museum was founded in 1976 and opened in 1978 as a collaboration between the town of Aurora, local mines, East Carolina University, and other interested parties. Visitors are allowed to collect fossils from the neighboring spoils pile.

Events
The museum has hosted a yearly Fossil Festival each May since 1983.  The festival includes a fossil auction.

References

External links

 
 Fossil Festival

Natural history museums in North Carolina
Museums in Beaufort County, North Carolina
Fossil museums
Geology museums in the United States
Paleontology in North Carolina
Historic Albemarle Tour